The Salsa Soul Sisters, Third World Wimmin Inc Collective was a group for lesbians who are also womanists and women of color, in New York City. The group is the oldest black lesbian organization in the United States. Arguments within the Salsa Soul Sisters resulted in the disbanding of the Salsa Soul Sisters into two groups, Las Buenas Amigas (Good Friends) made for Latinas, and African Ancestral Lesbians United for Societal Change made for African-diaspora lesbians.

Black Lesbian Caucus
The Salsa Soul Sisters grew out of the Black Lesbian Caucus of the New York City Gay Activists Alliance (GAA), which in turn split in 1971 from the original Gay Liberation Front. They originally called themselves the Third World Gay Women's Association, with the informal moniker "Salsa-Soul Sisters".

In 1974 the Black Lesbian Caucus reformulated itself as Salsa Soul Sisters, Third World Wimmin Inc, an autonomous group of black and Latina lesbians offering its members a social and political alternative to the lesbian and gay bars, which had "historically exploited and discriminated against lesbians of color". The Sisters started by "searching out each other, because of the strong needs we have in common" but also to "grow to understand the ways in which we differ."

Origins of the Salsa Soul Sisters 
The Salsa Soul Sisters was one of the first lesbian organizations created by and for women of color. The Salsa Soul Sisters was born out the need for an inclusive space for lesbian women of color to discuss the problems and concerns they face due to their sex and color. Early collective member and activist Candice Boyce said that, at the time of the group's founding, "there was no other place for women of color to go and sit down and talk about what it means to be a black lesbian in America". The founders hoped to create "an organization that is helpful and inspiring to third world gay women" and to "share in the strengthening and productivity of the whole gay community."

The group was comprised equally of African-American and Latina American women and went under the name "Salsa Soul Sisters" to highlight the fact. The name combines the Spanish word "salsa," which translates to "hot," with the black jargon "soul." The organization met weekly under the leadership of Reverend Dolores Jackson, who operated a prison ministry for Third World Women. The group was also founded by Harriet Alston, Sonia Bailey, and Luvenia Pinson, Candice Boyce and Maua Flowers. The members ranged from about two hundred women in ages ranging from seventeen to fifty-five. The women attended to discuss ideas and topics and share experiences with women who share similar lived experiences or offered new viewpoints or perspectives. The group's activities ranged from "vocational workshops and seminars on handicrafts, art crafts and martial arts for street protection". Further, the collective published quarterly magazines and a newsletter called the Gay-zette which posted information about functions, schedules, and social events. The Salsa Soul Sisters also provided a space for a cooperative babysitting venture where mothers could come to weekly meetings and bring their children and benefit from other mothers in the club.

Cofounding member Luvenia Pinson said that the "Salsa Soul Sisters provide geographic and psychological space for women to meet other Third World gay women. It gives a place to ventilate; a place to come and share ideas and experiences and meet people who might clean up their own personal interest." She is "glad we [Salsa Soul Sisters] can provide a thing, rather than for the women to go bars that rip them off."

Jemima Writers Collective
The Jemima Writers Collective was formed by members of the Salsa Soul Sisters to "meet the need for creative/artistic expression and to create a supportive atmosphere in which Black women could share their work and begin to eradicate negative self images."

Publications
Salsa Soul Sisters published several quarterly magazines, including Azalea: A Magazine by Third World Lesbians (1977-1983), and Salsa Soul Gayzette, (1982).

African Ancestral Lesbians United for Societal Change
The African Ancestral Lesbians United for Social Change (AALUSC) is newer name for the organization. The name change resulted from the group's shift from majority African-American and Latina women to include women of Asian and Native-American descent as well. The group is "committed to the spiritual, cultural, educational, economic and social empowerment of African Ancestral womyn". The AALUSC provides a space for all lesbians of the African Diaspora, regardless of language, culture, or class to become educated and empowered with the use of educational tools and resources and social opportunities for women such as dances, theater, cultural events, and conferences.

See also

 Black feminism
 Womanism

Additional Reading
New York History Society "We Are Never in it Alone" (2020)

References

External links 
 Aalusc at Lesbian Herstory Archives
African Ancestral Lesbians United for Social Change, Columbia University description of Social Movements. Retrieved on 24 March 2008.

African Americans' rights organizations
African-American women's organizations
African-American feminism
Feminism in New York City
Feminist collectives
Feminist organizations in the United States
History of women in New York City
Lesbian culture in New York (state)
LGBT organizations based in New York City
Lesbian collectives
Lesbian feminist organizations
Lesbian organizations in the United States
Multicultural feminism
Womanism
African-American LGBT organizations
Women's organizations based in the United States